Brian Fredrick Teta (born August 30, 1976) is an Emmy Award-winning television producer. Teta is currently the executive producer of The View, joining the series in its 19th season after spending 11 years working on The Late Show with David Letterman.

Early life and education 
Teta attended Baldwin High School in Nassau County, New York. After graduation, he attended Muhlenberg College in Allentown, Pennsylvania.

At Muhlenberg, Teta made his first forays into the broadcast industry, holding internships over the course of his career at Live with Regis and Kathie Lee, Montel, and The Late Show with David Letterman. He would later go on to work at Montel and The Late Show with David Letterman full-time. Teta worked as Paul Shaffer’s intern at the Late Show in 1997.

Teta also worked as a sports editor, entertainment editor and associate editor for The Muhlenberg Weekly, the official, independent student-run newspaper of Muhlenberg College, as well as hosting a weekly radio show on WMUH, which was named one of the top 20 college radio stations by the Princeton Review in 2000.

Career

The Late Show with David Letterman 
After graduating, Teta spent five years working as a talent booker and producer for shows such as Montel, Ricki Lake and Judge Hatchett before breaking into late night television as a talent coordinator at The Late Show with David Letterman, responsible for booking guests. One of his first tasks with The Late Show was at the 2004 Summer Olympics, tasked to booking gold medal winners for each show.

Teta also started out booking guests for David Letterman’s iconic segments “Stupid Pet Tricks and “Stupid Human Tricks.” [NY Post “Fetch Sketch” article].

He went on to work in numerous aspects of the show, including producing celebrity guest interviews, cooking segments, outdoor stunts, political guests and sports stars. He often produced Letterman's Christmas show, specifically Jay Thomas’ iconic annual segment with his Lone Ranger story and the “Quarterback Challenge.”

Teta's success booking sports guests led to a unique statistic for The Late Show: They are the first show to book the Super Bowl-winning quarterback 10 years in a row, dating back to Tom Brady after Super Bowl XXXIX in 2005. Teta would run down to the field at the end of the game to book the quarterback, often going up to the player himself to ask them personally.

In an interview with the New York Post in 2012, Teta spoke about turning The Late Show into a Super Bowl institution: “After the game the guy who wins is the hero of the moment and can do anything in the world. Lucky for us, that’s turned into, first, they’re going to Disney World, then they’re going to ‘The Late Show.’”

Teta advanced to the positions of Segment Producer in 2006, Producer in 2009, and Supervising Producer from 2012 till the show's conclusion in 2015. Teta was nominated for an Emmy Award for Outstanding Variety Series – Talk in 2015 for The Late Show with David Letterman.

The View 
In August of 2015, two months after Late Show ended, Teta was named Co-Executive Producer of The View at ABC, joining the show in its 19th season.

ABC tapped Teta to produce “Live from Hollywood: The After Party with Anthony Anderson,” the network's post-Oscars show.

Teta was elevated to Executive Producer on September 1, 2017, ahead of the debut of Season 21 of The View. The premiere week of Season 21 drew the show's largest overall audience in 3 years.

Since Teta joined the show, The View has been nominated for 26 Daytime Emmy awards, including 4 nominations for Teta for Outstanding Talk Show / Entertainment and 1 nomination and win for Outstanding Talk Show / Informative.

Personal life 
Teta resides in Rockville Centre, New York, with his wife Heather and their two daughters.

He is an avid New York sports fan, rooting for the New York Giants and the New York Yankees.

Teta, a lifelong comic book fan, was made a part of the Marvel Universe in April, 2006 when he was mentioned in Ms. Marvel Vol. 2, Issue #1, written by Brian Reed and illustrated by Roberto De La Torre, referencing his role as a talent booker for The Late Show with David Letterman.

References

American television producers
Living people
1976 births
Muhlenberg College alumni